Manolis Aliatidis (born 5 February 1995) is a Greek professional footballer who plays as a centre-back for Super League 2 club Anagennisi Karditsa.

Honours
Kavala
Kavala FCA Cup: 2017–18

References

1995 births
Living people
Greek footballers
Football League (Greece) players
Gamma Ethniki players
Super League Greece 2 players
Kozani F.C. players
Apollon Smyrnis F.C. players
GAS Ialysos 1948 F.C. players
Kavala F.C. players
Kalamata F.C. players
Niki Volos F.C. players
Anagennisi Karditsa F.C. players
Association football defenders
Footballers from Ptolemaida